7 Prisoners is a 2021 Brazilian drama film directed by Alexandre Moratto from a screenplay by Moratto and Thayná Mantesso. The film stars Christian Malheiros and Rodrigo Santoro and premiered at the 78th Venice International Film Festival on September 6, 2021. It was released on Netflix in November 2021.

Plot
18-year-old Mateus leaves the countryside in search for a job opportunity in a São Paulo junkyard. Once there, Mateus and some other boys become a victim of a work system analogous to modern slavery run by Luca, forcing Mateus to make the difficult decision between working for the man who enslaved him or risking his and his family's futures if he is not complicit.

Cast
 Christian Malheiros as Mateus
 Rodrigo Santoro as Luca
 Bruno Rocha
 Vitor Julian as Ezequiel
 Lucas Oranmian as Isaque
 Cecília Homem de Mello
 Dirce Thomaz

Production
During an interview with Film Independent on his award-winning directorial debut Sócrates, Brazilian-American filmmaker Alexandre Moratto announced that he was developing an original screenplay about modern slavery and human trafficking in Brazil. Moratto was set to re-team with co-writer Thayná Mantesso on the film. On September 5, 2020, Moratto revealed that he was collaborating again with directors Ramin Bahrani and Fernando Meirelles, through his production company O2 Filmes, to produce the film, with Netflix distributing. Bahrani, Moratto's film school mentor, presented the film to the company while directing The White Tiger. Speaking about the film, Moratto said:

The lead role of the film was written by Moratto specifically for Christian Malheiros, whom he discovered during intensive auditions for Sócrates where he was ultimately cast and rose to Brazilian prominence. Moratto also cast a Brazilian immigrant who worked for six months in a sweatshop while he was conducting research interviews with survivors of human trafficking.

Release
The film had its world premiere at the 78th Venice International Film Festival in the Horizons Extra section on September 6, 2021, which is set to be followed by its North American premiere at the 2021 Toronto International Film Festival in the Contemporary World Cinema section. After its festival screening, the film is scheduled to be released on Netflix globally in November 2021.

Reception 
On review aggregator Rotten Tomatoes, 98% of 45 critics have given the film a positive review, with an average rating of 7.5/10.

References

External links
 

2021 drama films
Brazilian drama films
Films about human trafficking
Films about immigration
Films about labour
Films about slavery
Portuguese-language Netflix original films
2020s Portuguese-language films